The 2015 President's Cup is the 65th season of the President's Cup. New Radiant Sports Club are the defending champions, having beaten Eagles in last season's final in extra time.

This is the first tournament under its current tournament format.

Participating teams
According to the current format, all teams playing in the 2015 Dhivehi Premier League will be appearing in the President's Cup.

Final draw
The draw took place on 12 August 2015 at the FAM House in Male'.

Venues
2 venues in two islands were selected for the tournament. Group stage matches are to be played at both venues; (Group A matches in Kulhudhuffushi and Group B matches in Addu City), while the knock-out round matches are scheduled to be held at Addu City.

Background
This is the second edition of this tournament, being played in a venue other than Male' since it was once held at Addu City in 1970. It is the first year for Kulhudhuffushi to host this tournament.

Format

The first round, or group stage, was a competition between the 8 teams divided among two groups of four, where each group engaged in a round-robin tournament within itself. The two highest ranked teams in each group advanced to the knockout stage. Teams were awarded three points for a win and one for a draw. When comparing teams in a group over-all result came before head-to-head.

The two semi-final losers competed in a third place play-off. For any match after the group stage, a draw after 90 minutes of regulation time was followed by two 15 minute periods of extra time to determine a winner. If the teams were still tied, a penalty shoot-out was held to determine a winner

Broadcasting rights
The broadcasting rights for some matches of 2015 Maldives President's Cup were given to the Television Maldives.

Group stage

Group A

Group B

Knockout stage

Semi-finals

Final

Statistics

Scorers

Assists

References

President's Cup (Maldives)
Pres